This list of museums in Washington, D.C. encompasses museums defined for this context as institutions (including nonprofit organizations, government entities, and private businesses) that collect and care for objects of cultural, artistic, scientific, or historical interest and make their collections or related exhibits available for public viewing. Also included are university and non-profit art galleries. Museums that exist only in cyberspace (i.e., virtual museums) are not included.

Museums

Defunct museums
 Army Medical Museum and Library, opened 1862, became the National Museum of Health and Medicine in 1989 and relocated to Silver Spring, Maryland in 2011
 Bead Museum, closed December 2008, museum website
 Black Fashion Museum, founded 1979, moved to Washington in 1994, closed in 2007 and collection donated to the National Museum of African American History and Culture
 Corcoran Gallery of Art, open 1869–2014. Art holdings donated to the National Gallery of Art, building donated to George Washington University.
 Fondo del Sol
 Marine Corps Museum, 1960–2005, collections now part of the National Museum of the Marine Corps
 National Gallery of Caricature and Cartoon Art, open 1994–1997, collections now at the Library of Congress.
 National Jewish Museum, collections now online, trying to establish to new museum
 National Museum of Crime & Punishment, closed in September 2015 and is now operated as Alcatraz East in Pigeon Forge, Tennessee
 National Pinball Museum, website, planned move to Baltimore, Maryland
 Newseum, founded 1997 in Rosslyn, Virginia, moved to Washington in 2008, closed December 2019 and is currently seeking new location.
 Washington Doll's House and Toy Museum, founded in 1975, closed 2004.
 Washington Gallery of Modern Art
 USS Barry (DD-933), opened as a museum ship in 1984, closed in 2015

See also

 Arboreta in Washington, D.C. (category)
 Aquaria in Washington, D.C. (category)
 Botanical gardens in Washington, D.C. (category)
 Houses in Washington, D.C. (category)
 Museums list
 Nature centers in Washington, D.C.
 Observatories in Washington, D.C. (category)
 Smithsonian museums
 Architecture of Washington, D.C.

References

External links

Cultural Tourism DC

Museums

Washington, D.C.
Washington
Museums